Adams is an unincorporated community in eastern Texas County, Oklahoma, United States. The community is six miles north-northeast of Optima Lake. The post office opened June 14, 1930. The community was named for Jesse L. Adams, engineer for the Rock Island Railroad.

Adams was the site of the Adams Woodframe Grain Elevator, which was listed on the National Register of Historic Places (NRHP). The community and its elevator were both established in 1926. The elevator was unusable from the 1980s, and was condemned because of the danger of its collapse.  It was then burned down in 2018.

Demographics

References 

Unincorporated communities in Texas County, Oklahoma
Unincorporated communities in Oklahoma
Oklahoma Panhandle
1926 establishments in Oklahoma
Populated places established in 1926